Cintegabelle is a railway station in Cintegabelle, Occitanie, France. The station is located on the Portet-Saint-Simon–Puigcerdà railway. The station is served by TER (local) services operated by the SNCF.

Train services
The following services currently call at Cintegabelle:
local service (TER Occitanie) Toulouse – Foix – Latour-de-Carol-Enveitg

References

Railway stations in France opened in 1861
Railway stations in Haute-Garonne